Elio Costa (born 21 August 1940 in Maierato) is an Italian politician and magistrate.

Costa ran as an independent for the office of Mayor of Vibo Valentia at the 2002 Italian local elections, supported by a centre-right coalition. He won the election and served as Mayor of Vibo Valentia until his resignation on 15 January 2005.

He was re-elected on 3 June 2015, but he resigned for the second time on 31 January 2019, after a new internal government crisis.

See also
2015 Italian local elections
List of mayors of Vibo Valentia

References

External links
 
 

1940 births
Living people
Mayors of Vibo Valentia